The 1971 Navy Midshipmen football team represented the United States Naval Academy (USNA) as an independent during the 1971 NCAA University Division football season. The team was led by third-year head coach Rick Forzano.

Schedule

Roster

Not listed (missing number/class/position): Don Canterna

References

Navy
Navy Midshipmen football seasons
Navy Midshipmen football